Marple Hall School is a secondary school located in Marple, Greater Manchester.

Admissions
The headteacher is Joseph Barker. The school is situated just off the Stockport Road (A626) on the outskirts of Greater Manchester, near the River Goyt.

History

Grammar school
The co-educational comprehensive school was originally Marple Hall County Grammar School, a grammar school, which was built in 1960 by Cheshire Education Committee alongside the demolished remains of Marple Hall, a manor house once owned by John Bradshaw who signed the death warrant of Charles I of England, and Charles Isherwood whose family also owned the house. The ruins of the house are still visible just outside the grounds of the school. These two figures give their names to the two main buildings of the modern school. The grammar school's first headmaster was Reginald Hill.

The grammar school later had separate boys and girls schools. Marple Hall County Grammar School for Girls opened in 1965 and had 750 girls in 1967, and 1000 by 1971. Marple Hall Grammar School for Boys had 1000 boys in 1972. In 1967 the girls school had a six form entry. The head teacher of the girls school up to 1974 was Miss Una Drake.

Comprehensive
The school was converted into the mixed sex Marple Hall County High School in September 1974 with a nine form entry. The joint headmaster, Derek J Saville, was appointed in September 1973. It was originally to be called Marple Hall County Comprehensive. From April 1974, the school was administered by Stockport MBC. The new school taught Russian in the sixth form and had 1900 boys and girls, with 450 in the sixth form. From 1974 until 1980, the school had comprehensive year groups and grammar (selective intake) year groups. The last selective intake, from entry in 1973, left in 1980; the first year group of comprehensive intake left in 1979 (after GCE O levels) and 1981 (after GCE A levels).

Following Mr Saville's retirement, the sixth form was closed in 1990 after the arrival of the new Head, Margaret Cuckson. Miss Cuckson remained at Headteacher until 2004 when she was replaced by Mrs Lesley Calderbank and under whose tenure the school was in the news for having a year nine Maths class being taught by ten different teachers in two terms. The previous Head, Dr Rose Hegan, took over in September 2010. Dr Hegan resigned in 2013 to be replaced by Mr Joseph Barker who had been working at the school as a history teacher and deputy head prior to Dr Hegan's resignation. The school was again in the news in September 2015 after sending home up to 100 students for having incorrect uniforms.

Notable alumni

 Fran Abrams, Radio 4 investigative journalist
 Kyle Bartley, football player
 Karl Davies, actor 
 Rachel Haugh, architect
 Peter Holland FRS, Linacre Professor of Zoology at the University of Oxford
 Ann Geraldine Limb, first woman chair of The Scout Association
 Wyl Menmuir, Man Booker Prize nominated author, 2016
 Sally Rogers, actress

Marple Hall Grammar School for Boys
 Peter Bowker, screenwriter
 Stephen Bradbury (artist)

Marple Hall Grammar School for Girls
 Dame Ann Limb, the first woman Chair of The Scout Association
 Thelma Walker, Labour MP since 2017 for Colne Valley

References

External links
 EduBase

Secondary schools in the Metropolitan Borough of Stockport
Educational institutions established in 1960
1960 establishments in England
Community schools in the Metropolitan Borough of Stockport
Marple, Greater Manchester